Ultra Living is the fraternal team of Takuma Nonaka and Tetsushi Nonaka. Their first album, Monochromatic Adventure, was released from Creation Records in 1998. Since then they have released four albums, collaborated with Mike Ladd in "Preppy MC Death of Hip Hop Vol.1" from Ozone, and done several remix works including HiM (band)'s single from FatCat Records.

Currently, they are also members of HiM (band).

Members
Takuma Nonaka
Tetsushi Nonaka
(Shinpei Okaya)
(Yuji Takahashi)
(Kyoko Brown)

Discography

Albums
1998 Monochromatic Adventure (Creation Records)
2000 Transgression (Artefact/France, Afterhours/Japan, Bubblecore/US Distribution) featuring Mice Parade, Mike Ladd, Kyoko Brown
2002 Through (Afterhours/Japan, Bubblecore/US Distribution)
2007 Zoonomia (P-Vine Records/Japan)

Singles
1997 "Freeze, Die & Revive" (Creation Records)
1997 "Sweetest Pleasure" (Creation Records)
1998 "Homesick" (Creation Records)
2000 "Absurdly Pedantic" (Artefact/France)
2001 "Preppy MC Death of Hip Hop Vol.1" (Ozone/US) featuring Mike Ladd

Remixes
1996 "Gone" / The Cure (Elektra Records)
1996 "Bullfrog Green" / The Boo Radleys (Creation Records)
1998 "It's Like the Man Said" / Pigeonhed (Sub Pop)
1998 "Keep on Keepin' On" / Pigeonhed (Sub Pop)
1998 "Rev Splash" / Ken Ishii (Sony Records)
1999 "PRMX 1" / Puffy AmiYumi (Sony Records)
2002 "Sea Level" / HiM (band) (Fat Cat Records)

Video Games
2005 Flipnic: Ultimate Pinball (Capcom)

References

External links
 Ultra Living My Space
 Ultra Living - Transgression on AnthologyRecordings.com

Creation Records artists